Luigi de Magistris may refer to:

Luigi De Magistris (cardinal) (born 1926), Italian Roman Catholic cardinal
Luigi de Magistris (politician) (born 1967), Italian politician and magistrate